Socialist Movement of the Senegalese Union (in French: Mouvement Socialiste d'Union Sénégalaise) was a splinter group of French Section of the Workers' International (SFIO) in Senegal. MSUS appeared in 1956 and merged into the Senegalese Popular Bloc (BPS).

Source: Nzouankeu, Jacques Mariel. Les partis politiques sénégalais. Dakar: Editions Clairafrique, 1984. 

Political parties established in 1956
Political parties in Senegal
Political schisms
Socialist parties in Senegal